The 2008 Albanian Cup Final was the 56th final of the Albanian Cup. The final was played at Ruzhdi Bizhuta Stadium in Elbasan on 7 May 2008. The match was contested by Vllaznia, who beat Dinamo Tirana in their semi-final, and Tirana who beat Elbasani. Vllaznia opened the scoring in the 3rd minute with midfielder Gilman Lika, they then won the game with a second on 38 minutes through Xhevahir Sukaj to give Vllaznia their sixth Albanian Cup success.

Match

Details

References

Cup Final
Albanian Cup Finals
Albanian Cup Final, 2008
Albanian Cup Final, 2008
Sports competitions in Elbasan
Football in Elbasan